Tough love is a term used in behaviour modification.

Tough Love may also refer to:

Books
Tough Love, a 2019 non-fiction book by Susan Rice
Tough Love (novel), by Kerry Katona
Tough Love: High School Confidential, a graphic novel by Abby Denson

Film, TV and radio
Toughlove, a 1985 television film featuring Sean Frye
Tough Love (2015 film), a German film
Tough Love (2017 film), a Nigerian film
Tough Love (TV series), a 2009–2013 reality television series on VH1
Tough Love (web series), a 2015 web series
Tough Love, the title of the 2000 first series of the British television show Lenny Blue
"Tough Love" (Buffy the Vampire Slayer), a 2001 episode of Buffy the Vampire Slayer
Tough Love with Mick Molloy, an Australian radio program
Tough Love with Hilary Farr, a 2021-present HGTV home design show

Music
Tough Love (duo), a British dance music duo

Albums
Tough Love (Magic Dirt album), 2003
Tough Love (Gala album), a 2009 album by Gala
Tough Love: Best of the Ballads, a 2011 compilation album by Aerosmith
Tough Love (Pulled Apart by Horses album), 2012
Tough Love (Jessie Ware album), 2014

Songs
"Tough Love", a song by the British new wave group Squeeze from album Babylon and On, 1987 
"Tough Love", a song by The Law from The Law
"Tough Love", a song by Suzie McNeil from album Dear Love, 2012
"Tough Love" (Jessie Ware song), a song by Jessie Ware, 2014
"Tough Love" (Avicii song), a song by Avicii from the album Tim, 2019